Nolan Clarence Franz (born September 11, 1959) is a former American football wide receiver.  After playing in the United States Football League (USFL) for the Boston/New Orleans/Portland Breakers from 1983 to 1985, Franz was a member of the Green Bay Packers of the National Football League (NFL).  Franz was born in New Orleans, Louisiana.  He played at the college football at Tulane University.

See also

 List of Green Bay Packers players

References

1959 births
Living people
American football wide receivers
Green Bay Packers players
Tulane Green Wave football players
Players of American football from New Orleans